The Ride to Conquer Cancer was created in 2008 as a "mega-event" annual fundraiser in support of cancer research at the Princess Margaret Cancer Centre in Ontario, Canada. Funds raised from the Ride benefit people from across Canada and around the world.

The Ride is non-competitive cycling adventure that sees thousands of riders travel more than 200 kilometres over two days. During the inaugural year in 2008, $14 million was raised for Princess Margaret Cancer Centre. Following the success of the first Ride, the event was licensed out to cancer charities in Montreal, Calgary and Vancouver. Importantly, 100% of the License Fees went back into a National collaborative clinical trials initiative.

The original event agency supporting the Canadian edition of the Ride to Conquer Cancer took the program to Australia in 2011 where the event lasted four years.  The previous Canadian charity partners decided to launch their own local bike ride fundraising initiatives in 2021 and are no longer associated with the Ride to Conquer Cancer. Today, The Ride to Conquer Cancer is an aspirational epic ride fundraiser benefitting Princess Margaret with participants coming from all 10 provinces, two Territories, 17 states and 7 countries worldwide.

Over the 14-year history of The Ride, over $220 million has been raised in Ontario and over $410 Million across Canada. It was the number one Peer-to-Peer fundraising brand in Canada from 2014 to 2019.  Differing from other fundraisers, the event focuses on having a relatively small number of participants who raise considerably more money in support of cancer research. Historically, each participant was required to raise a minimum of $2,500 in order to ride. In 2020, due to the COVID-19 pandemic, the event was cancelled in Montreal and postponed  in Vancouver. In Ontario and Alberta, the Ride pivoted to a virtual experience where the fundraising minimum and registration fee were removed, and riders chose their own route and distance.

Organization
Princess Margaret Cancer Centre is one of the top 5 cancer research centres in the world. With 3400+ staff, and the largest roster of cancer surgeons in Canada, over 200+ types of cancer are treated at Princess Margaret. In 2019, the cancer centre saw 17,433 new patients. Among the services provided in 2019, we delivered 6,387 surgical procedures, 88,555 radiation therapy visits, 52,949 systemic therapy & transfusion visits and 485 stem cell transplants. The clinical trials program also continues to grow in volume and breadth with 2,765 patients enrolled in clinical trials.

Through ongoing research, education and innovation, Princess Margaret continues to be on the frontiers of medical, surgical and radiation oncology, embracing the latest technology and international best-practices and setting standards for patient care.

Ontario
The Ride is an EPIC, 2-day, 200 km+ cycling event where thousands of participants from across Canada and around the world ride between Toronto to Niagara Falls. Cyclists seek the support of their networks, friends and family to fundraise in support of research being conducted at Princess Margaret Cancer Centre. Since 2008, the Ontario Ride has raised more than $220 Million for cancer research and care. As a result of COVID-19, The Ride went virtual in 2020 and again in 2021, therefore participants cycle their own route and distance.

For the past 10 years, Enbridge has been the Title sponsor of the Ride to Conquer Cancer.

The top fundraising team of all time in the Ride is Steve’s Cyclepaths, typically raising over $1 Million each year. Each year in the Ontario Ride, approximately 200 survivor Riders take part. Survivor Riders affix a yellow flag on their bike to denote their successful cancer journey and are celebrated by the Ride community during the event.

British Columbia
The British Columbia Ride originates in Vancouver, and crosses into the United States to finish in Seattle.  Nearly 2,642 Riders raised $10.4 million in 2013 in support of the B.C. Cancer Foundation. In 2018, The Ride changed destinations to Hope, British Columbia instead of Seattle. Due to smoke from forest fires the Ride could not reach Hope and instead a loop was created with the riders returning to the Chilliwack on the Sunday. In 2019, the weather cooperated and the riders were able to make it to Hope. Over 2,100 riders participated in the 2019 Ride, raising $9.1 million. Over the eleven years the B.C. Ride has raised over $105.1 million!   As of 2018, the ride is switching routes from Vancouver to Hope, BC.

Alberta
The Alberta ride originates at Spruce Meadows in Calgary and heads southwest to Chain Lakes Provincial Park in the foothills of the Rocky Mountains before returning to Calgary. 1,655 riders raised $7.5 million in support of the Alberta Cancer Foundation in 2013.

Quebec
The Quebec Ride originates at Montreal and finishes in Quebec City and supports Sir Mortimer B. Davis Jewish General Hospital in Montreal. 1,778 riders raised $6.3 million in 2013.

Australia
The event went international in 2011, as The Rio Tinto Ride to Conquer Cancer took place in Brisbane in August 2011 and 2012. The event has raised  nearly $10 million for cancer research at the Queensland Institute of Medical Research, one of the largest research institutes in Australia.

Rides also now take place annually in Perth, Sydney, and Melbourne.

In 2013, the Brisbane Ride, sponsored by Rio Tinto, had 1,236 participating riders, raising $4.2 million for QIMR Berghofer Medical Research Institute. The ride originated from Brisbane, breaking in Lake Wivenhoe, and returning to Brisbane.

The Melbourne Ride originated from Victoria in 2013. 1,223 participating riders raised $4.3 million for the Peter MacCallum Cancer Centre.

The Perth Ride, sponsored by Sunsuper, had 1,336 riders in 2013, raising $5.2 million for Harry Perkins Institute of Medical Research (formerly Western Australian Institute for Medical Research).

The Sydney Ride, sponsored by Sunsuper, had 1,034 participating riders in 2013, raising $4.1 million for the Chris O'Brien Lifehouse.

New Zealand
2013 was the first year of The Ride to Conquer Cancer benefiting Cancer Society Auckland.  663 riders raised $2.1 million.

References

External links 
 The Ride to Conquer Cancer – Australia
 The Ride to Conquer Cancer – Canada

Cancer fundraisers
Cycling events in Australia
Organizations established in 2008
Cycling events in Canada
Cycling events in the United States
Cancer in Australia